Athos Solomou (born 30 November 1985) is a Cypriot professional footballer who plays for Haringey Borough in the Isthmian League Premier Division. He is mainly a right winger but he also plays as right back also.

Club career

Apollon Limassol
Solomou started his career from Apollon Limassol's Academy. He made his debut with Apollon on season 2002-03. He stayed in Apollon for 7 years and he won one Cypriot Championship and one Cypriot Super Cup with the team.

APOEL
On 10 September 2009 Solomou signed a three-years contract with APOEL and the next season he helped APOEL to win the 2010–11 Cypriot First Division. He also appeared in three 2011–12 UEFA Champions League matches for APOEL, in the club's surprising run to the quarter-finals of the competition. At the end of the 2012–13 season, he became champion again with APOEL, after winning the 2012–13 Cypriot First Division.

During the 2013–14 season, he appeared in three 2013–14 UEFA Europa League group stage matches for APOEL and won all the titles in Cyprus, the Cypriot League, the Cypriot Cup and the Cypriot Super Cup.

On 2 June 2014, APOEL announced that it would not renew the contract with the player and after five successful years, Solomou left the club.

Rah Ahan
On 20 January 2016, Solomou joined Persian Gulf League side Rah Ahan on a 6-month contract for an undisclosed fee.

Later career
Solomou joined AEZ Zakakiou for the 2016–17 season, but made only four appearances. In the 2017–18 season, he played for FC International Limassol in the fifth tier. He joined Digenis Oroklinis in the Cypriot Second Division in the 2018–19 season, but did not play any games and dropped down a division to play for Ethnikos Assia. After briefly joining Elpida Astromeriti in June 2019, Solomou moved to England and joined Haringey Borough for the 2019–20 season.

Honours
 Apollon Limassol
Cypriot First Division (1) : 2005–06
Cypriot Super Cup (1) : 2006

 APOEL
Cypriot First Division (3) : 2010–11, 2012–13, 2013–14
Cypriot Cup (1) : 2013–14
Cypriot Super Cup (2) : 2011, 2013

References

External links
 
 
 

Living people
1985 births
Apollon Limassol FC players
APOEL FC players
Enosis Neon Paralimni FC players
ASC Oțelul Galați players
Doxa Katokopias FC players
Rah Ahan players
AEZ Zakakiou players
Digenis Oroklinis players
Ethnikos Assia FC players
Haringey Borough F.C. players
Cypriot First Division players
Cypriot Second Division players
Liga I players
Persian Gulf Pro League players
Isthmian League players
Cypriot footballers
Cyprus international footballers
Cypriot expatriate footballers
Expatriate footballers in Romania
Expatriate footballers in Iran
Expatriate footballers in England
Association football midfielders
Cypriot expatriate sportspeople in England
Cypriot expatriate sportspeople in Iran
Cypriot expatriate sportspeople in Romania